The 2007–08 Slovak Cup was the 39th season of Slovakia's annual knock-out cup competition and the fourteenth since the independence of Slovakia. It began on 7 August 2007 with Round 1 and ended on 1 May 2008 with the Final. The winners of the competition earned a place in the First qualifying round of the UEFA Cup. Zlaté Moravce were the defending champions.

First round
The sixteen games were played on 7 August 2007 and the match TJ Sokol Dolná Ždaňa – HFK Prievidza was played on 21 August 2007.

 
|}

Second round
The ten games were played on 18 September 2007 and the three games were played on 19 September 2007.

|}

Third round
The six games were played on 2 and 3 October 2007, the match DAC Dunajská Streda – Artmedia Petržalka was played on 10 October and the match HFC Humenné – Spartak Trnava on 10 October 2007.

|}

Quarter-finals
The first legs were played on 23 and 24 October, 6 and 14 November 2007. The second legs were played on 20 and 28 November and 5 December 2007.

|}

Semi-finals
The first legs were played on 8 April 2008. The second legs were played on 22 and 23 April 2008.

|}

Final

References

External links
profutbal.sk 
Results on RSSSF

Slovak Cup seasons
Slovak Cup
Cup